Ashford Hill  is a British national nature reserve next to the village of Ashford Hill in Hampshire. Part of the reserve is a designated a Site of Special Scientific Interest (SSSI). The site is one of Natural Englands nature reserves

Geography

The reserve is a series of low-lying meadows in the valley of a small stream and also features woodland areas. The meadows area mix of London Clay and Bagshot beds.

The stream is called Baughurst Brook and eventually drains into the River Enborne.

History
The wooded areas are believed to be part of the medieval royal forest of Pamber.

Fauna
The nature reserve has the following fauna:

Birds

Invertebrates

Flora
The nature reserve has the following flora:

Trees
Alder
Hawthorn
Blackthorn

Plants

References

External links 
 Hampshire Nature reserves

Nature reserves in Hampshire
Local Nature Reserves in Hampshire
Sites of Special Scientific Interest in Hampshire